Judith Graßl  (born 6 April 1968) is a German ski mountaineer.

Graßl was born in Berchtesgaden. She is married to the ski mountaineer Franz Graßl with two children. They live in Ramsau bei Berchtesgaden.

Selected results 
 2003:
 4th, European Championship single race
 5th, European Championship team race (together with Traudl Maurer)
 6th, European Championship combination ranking
 2004:
 1st, German Championship single
 2005:
 2nd, European Cup team (together with Barbara Gruber)
 3rd, European Championship relay race (together with Barbara Gruber and Silvia Treimer)
 3rd, European Championship (together with Barbara Gruber)
 7th, World Cup team (together with Barbara Gruber)
 9th, European Championship single race
 2006:
 2nd, German Championship single
 4th, World Championship relay race (together with Barbara Gruber, Silvia Treimer and Stefanie Koch)
 4th, World Championship team race (together with Stefanie Koch)
 2007:
 2nd, Sellaronda Skimarathon (together with Stefanie Koch)
 3rd, German Championship single
 3rd, Trofeo Mezzalama (together with Stefanie Koch and Silvia Treimer)
 4th, European Championship team race (together with Stefanie Koch)
 4th, European Championship (together with Stefanie Koch and Silvia Treimer)
 7th, European Championship combination ranking
 8th, European Championship single race
 2008:
 1st, German Championship team
 3rd, German Championship single
 3rd, German Championship vertical race
 3rd, Rofan Xtreme
 6th, World Championship team race (together with Stefanie Koch)
 7th, Pierra Menta (together with Stefanie Koch)
 2010:
 2nd, Sellaronda Skimarathon, together with Barbara Gruber
 2012:
 1st, Sellaronda Skimarathon, together with Barbara Gruber

Patrouille des Glaciers 

 2006: 3rd, together with Silvia Treimer and Stefanie Koch
 2008: 4th, together with Stefanie Koch and Silvia Treimer

External links 
 Judith Graßl at skimountaineering.com

References 

1968 births
Living people
German female ski mountaineers
People from Berchtesgaden
Sportspeople from Upper Bavaria